"Trippin' on Sunshine" is the debut single by British electronic music duo Pizzaman, consisting of John Reid and Norman Cook, released in 1994 from their only album, Pizzamania (1995). The "You, me, all of us, are looking for the key..." vocal sample in the song is taken from the 1968 single "World of Love" by Canadian R&B/soul band Mandala. And the "Trippin' on Sunshine" vocal sample is from "Accapella Sunshine" by Rockers Revenge featuring Donnie Calvin. 

It peaked at number 33 on the UK Singles Chart, but after the success of the duo's next singles, "Sex on the Streets" and "Happiness", the song was re-released in 1996, this time peaking at number 18. It is their highest-charting single to date. It also reached number two on the UK Dance Chart and number 26 in Scotland.

Critical reception
James Hamilton from Music Week described the 1996 re-release of the song as "Norman Cook's exuberant salsa kicker from summer 1994 swirlingly builds through hoarse roaring, reedy organ and a Rocker's Revenge refrain in its exciting original 0-127.9-0bpm Pizzaman Club Mix".

Music video
A music video was produced to promote the song, directed by American filmmaker and photojournalist Michael Dominic. It was later published on YouTube in June 2010.

Track listing
 12", UK (1994)
"Trippin on Sunshine"
"Mixing Thing"
"Trippin on Sunshine" (Dub)
"DJ Delite #4"

 12", UK (1996)
"Trippin' on Sunshine" (Biff & Memphis Mix) — 9:52
"Trippin' on Sunshine" (Playboys Mixing Thing) — 4:11
"Trippin' on Sunshine" (Pizzaman Club Mix) — 6:55
"Trippin' on Sunshine" (Impulsion Big Pizza π Mix) — 6:34

 CD single, UK (1994)
"Trippin' on Sunshine" (Radio Edit) — 3:52
"Trippin' on Sunshine" (Play Boys Mixing Thing) — 4:11
"Trippin' on Sunshine" (Pizzaman Mix) — 6:55
"Trippin' on Sunshine" (California Sunshine Mix) — 7:35
"Trippin' on Sunshine" (12" Play Boys Fully Loaded Dub) — 7:50

 CD single, UK (1996)
"Trippin' on Sunshine" (Radio Edit) — 3:25
"Trippin' on Sunshine" (Biff & Memphis Mix) — 9:52
"Trippin' on Sunshine" (Pizzaman Club Mix) — 6:55
"Trippin' on Sunshine" (California Sunshine Mix) — 7:36
"Trippin' on Sunshine" (Playboys Dub) — 7:48

Charts

References

 

1994 debut singles
1996 singles
1994 songs
Big beat songs
House music songs
Electro (music)
Songs written by Norman Cook